Roland Lessing (born 14 April 1978 in Tartu) is a former Estonian biathlete. His first World Cup podium was in Pokljuka Pursuit 20 December 2009.

He represented Estonia at the 2018 Winter Olympics, his fifth consecutive Olympic Games.

References

External links 

 Profile on biathlonworld.com 
 Statistics

1978 births
Living people
Sportspeople from Tartu
Estonian male biathletes
Biathletes at the 2002 Winter Olympics
Biathletes at the 2006 Winter Olympics
Biathletes at the 2010 Winter Olympics
Biathletes at the 2014 Winter Olympics
Biathletes at the 2018 Winter Olympics
Olympic biathletes of Estonia